Waldkirchen is a small village in the municipality of Seubersdorf in the German state of Bavaria. It is in the Upper Palatinate, in the Neumarkt district. It has a total population of about 25 people.

Geography
The village lies about 21 kilometers south-east from Neumarkt, on the Franconian Jura.

Climate
The climate in Waldkirchen is categorized in the Köppen climate classification as Dfb (humid continental). The average temperature of 7.4 °C is slightly below the German average (7.8 °C), the average precipitation of 762 mm per year above the German average (approximately 700 mm).

References

External links
 Ittelhofen mit Waldkirchen on the homepage of the municipality of Seubersdorf

Neumarkt (district)
Villages in Bavaria